Chukwuemeka Jude Diji born 2 December 1966, a Nigerian, Associate professor of Mechanical engineering and Deputy Vice Chancellor: Research, Innovation, Consultancy and Extension (DVC-RICE) for Kampala International University Uganda. He also served as the head of department Mechanical Engineering for the University of Ibadan Nigeria.

Education
Chukwuemeka holds a Master of Science and PhD in Mechanical engineering from the University of Ibadan Nigeria in 1997 and 2008 receptively. He obtained his Bachelor of Science in Mechanical engineering from Obafemi Awolowo University formerly known as the University of Ife, in 1987.

Career
During his early years, Prof chukwuemeka worked with a water drilling and prospecting company SOAG drilling company based in Ife Nigeria as a Mechanical engineer. He then went on to work as a production manager at Beta industries Nigeria limited, from 1989 to 1996. He worked as a factory manager with the Tolaram Clay Brick Industries in Ikorodu Lagos for three months before he joined university service.
Chukwuemeka joined University service as a lecturer in 1998 at the University of Ibadan under the department of Mechanical Engineering.

Other Considerations
Chukwuemeka is a member of society at Solar Energy Society of Nigeria. He is also a member of the Nigerian Society of Engineers the Automobile Engineers's institute.

References

1966 births
Living people
Academic staff of Kampala International University
Nigerian engineers
Obafemi Awolowo University alumni
University of Ibadan alumni
Academic staff of the University of Ibadan